The Me are a partly Muslim and partly Hindu community found in the state of Gujarat in India. They are one of a number of communities of Maldhari pastoral nomads found in the Banni region of Kutch. The Me are also known as the Wadha Koli.

History and origin 
The community get their name Me from the Kutchi word me, which means buffalo. They are concentrated in 110 villages of Abdasa Taluka of Kutch. According to some traditions, the Me were once Kolis, and many call themselves Wadha Koli. Their habitat is part of the Banni  region. The community is rare in that it observed both Islamic and Hindu rituals and practices. During the 1970s, the bulk of the community abandoned Islamic customs, and embraced Hinduism. A few of the Bhuj Me have now adopted Islam, and the community is split along religious lines.

Present circumstances 

The community is concentrated in the talukas of Bhuj, Abdasa and Mandvi in Kutch District of Gujarat.  They speak a dialect of Kutchi, with substantial Sindhi loan words. The Me consists of seven clans, the main ones being the Khode, Payri, Yoyi, Notada, Chandri, Mattani and Aspan. They are an endogamous community, and marriages between the clans is the norm.

The Me are pastoral Maldhari nomads, raising buffaloes, cows and sheep, and graze these in the Banni region. They also act the traditional carpenters of the Kutch region.

References 

Social groups of Gujarat
Tribes of Kutch
Maldhari communities
Muslim communities of India
Muslim communities of Gujarat
Sindhi tribes
Sindhi tribes in India